Jahangiri (also Romanized as Jahāngīrī) is a village in Qilab Rural District, Alvar-e Garmsiri District, Andimeshk County, Khuzestan Province, Iran. At the 2006 census, its population was 605, in 116 families.

References 

Populated places in Andimeshk County